The University of Chicago Medical Center (UChicago Medicine) is a nationally ranked academic medical center located in Hyde Park on the South Side of Chicago. It is the flagship campus for The University of Chicago Medicine system and was established in 1898. Affiliated with and located on The University of Chicago campus, it also serves as the teaching hospital for Pritzker School of Medicine. Primary medical facilities on campus include the Center for Care and Discovery, Bernard A. Mitchell Hospital, and Comer Children's Hospital.

In 2019, U.S. News & World Report ranked UChicago Medicine the second-best hospital in both Chicago and Illinois behind Northwestern Memorial Hospital.

History
The University of Chicago Medicine and Biological Sciences, one of the nation's leading academic medical institutions, was founded in 1927 when it first opened to patients. Today, it comprises The University of Chicago Pritzker School of Medicine; The University of Chicago Biological Sciences Division, a section committed to scientific discovery; and The University of Chicago Medical Center. Twelve Nobel Prize winners in physiology or medicine have been affiliated with The University of Chicago Medicine.

In 1988, The University of Chicago Medicine decided to close its adult trauma center. At the time, the decision was made because the trauma center was losing a large amount of money and taking away resources from other specialties.

University of Chicago Medicine physicians are members of The University of Chicago Physicians Group, which includes about 900 physicians and covers the full array of medical and surgical specialties. The physicians are faculty members of the Pritzker School of Medicine.

These organizations are headed by Kenneth S. Polonsky, MD, Dean of the Biological Sciences Division and the Pritzker School of Medicine, and executive vice president for medical affairs at The University of Chicago.

Between 2005 and 2009, former First Lady Michelle Obama served as vice-president for Community and External Affairs. Obama resigned the position in 2009 as she and then President Barack Obama prepared their move to the White House.

Calls for a new adult level 1 trauma center surfaced after the death of Damian Turner, an 18-year-old who was killed by gunshot in August 2010. Hospital representatives have said that building an adult trauma center would compromise the other distinct and critically important services for the community, such as The South Side's only level 1 trauma center for children, the South Side's only burn unit, its emergency departments for adults and children and the neonatal intensive care unit. Protesters have suggested that The University of Chicago should not be seeking financial support to attract the presidential library of Barack Obama without first committing to reopening an adult trauma facility.

The Center for Care and Discovery (CCD) opened in 2013 and to date serves as the flagship hospital for UChicago Medicine. The 10-story facility has 436 beds in all private rooms, 52 intensive care beds, 9 suites for advanced imaging and interventional procedures and 23 operating rooms designed to accommodate hybrid and robotic procedures.

In December 2015, the university announced that it would be restarting the level 1 adult trauma center at the hospital. Furthermore, the university announced plans to expand The University of Chicago Medical Center. The center now includes 188 additional beds and has increased the hospital to its biggest size since the 1970s. The expansion was in response to an increased demand for bed space, as the medical center had been operating near capacity.

On December 29, 2017, a new adult emergency room connected to the Center for Care and Discovery opened for patient care. On May 1, 2018, the new Level 1 trauma center officially opened. The center is expected to serve between 2,700 and 4,000 patients a year and is the South Side's first Level I trauma center since the late 1980s. The remainder of the expansion is expected to be finished by 2022.

As of 2019, National Institute of Health research funding reached $168 million annually.

Composition
 
University of Chicago Medicine consists of:
 Center for Care and Discovery, the primary adult inpatient care facility (opened in 2013 at a cost of $700 million)
 Bernard A. Mitchell Hospital, adult inpatient care facility which houses the Burn and Complex Wound Center
Comer Children's Hospital, including the university's Pediatric Level 1 Trauma Center
 University of Chicago Medicine Family Birth Center, a maternity and women's hospital
 Duchossois Center for Advanced Medicine, an outpatient care facility
 Pritzker School of Medicine
 The Knapp Center for Biomedical Discovery (KCBD)
 The University of Chicago Comprehensive Cancer Center (in the main campus and other locations)
 UChicago Medicine Ingalls Memorial, Harvey, Illinois
 UChicago Medicine at Ingalls - Calumet City
 UChicago Medicine at Ingalls - Crestwood
 UChicago Medicine at Ingalls - Flossmoor
 UChicago Medicine Outpatient Center at Ingalls - Harvey
 UChicago Medicine at Ingalls - South Holland
 UChicago Medicine at Ingalls - Tinley Park
 regional physician offices located throughout the Chicago area

Recognition
The University of Chicago Medical Center is frequently ranked among the best in the country and a leader in both Chicago and Illinois by U.S. News & World Report. The 2010 rankings by U.S. News & World Report included the following 11 adult medical specialties: 
digestive disorders (6),
cancer (15),
endocrinology (18),
kidney disease (21),
respiratory disorders (21),
heart (27),
urology  (28),
geriatrics (29),
gynecology (34),
neurology and neurosurgery (36) and,
ear, nose, and throat (38). Until 2012, it was the only hospital in Illinois ever to be included on the magazine's "Honor Roll" of the best hospitals in the United States, and has made this coveted list 10 times.

References

External links
 University of Chicago Medicine
 University of Chicago Medicine Comer Children's Hospital
University of Chicago Hospitals and Clinics Collection 1924-1993 at the University of Chicago Special Collections Research Center

Hospitals in Chicago
University of Chicago
Hospital networks in the United States
Teaching hospitals in Illinois